The 1908 Club Atlético Boca Juniors season was the squad's debuting season in Primera B (then named "Segunda División"), the 2nd. level of Argentine league system. After winning some friendly tournaments, the executives of the club decided to affiliate it to the Argentine Football Association. As there was no promotion and relegation system by then, Boca Juniors registered to the second level to play official competitions for the first time in the history of the club.

Boca Juniors' debut in official tournaments was on May 3, 1908, when the squad defeated Belgrano A.C. II by 3–1 in the stadium of Virrey del Pino and Superí of Belgrano neighborhood. Boca Juniors starting line-up for that historic match was: Juan de los Santos; Marcelino Vergara, Luis Cerezo; Guillermo Ryan, Alberto Penney, Juan Priano; Arturo Penney, Manuel Eloiso, Rafael Pratts, Pedro Moltedo, José María Farenga. Boca Juniors' goals were scored by Pratts (2) and Eloiso. Gibraltar-born Rafael Pratts also became the first player to score a goal for Boca Juniors in official matches. The squad finished in first place (among eight teams) and qualified for the next stage, the semifinal, where Boca was beat by Racing Club 1–0.

The team played in a field located at southwest of Buenos Aires, near the Isla Demarchi and Puerto Madero. Although Boca finished 1st. in the regular season with 29 points in 16 matches played, the team did not promote to Primera División so the squad lost to Racing Club de Avellaneda at playoffs. Then Racing lost to River Plate the final.

Squad

Championship format and teams 
The Segunda División championship was contested by 36 teams divided into four groups of nine teams each. Boca played in Group C with San Isidro II, Gimnasia y Esgrima (BA), Belgrano A.C. II, Bernal, Continental II , Royal, Villa Ballester, and La Plata F.C..

Notes

Matches 
 = Won;  = Drew;  = Lost

Segunda División

Group C

Group C standings 

Notes

Promotion playoff 

Suspended on 86'

Copa Bullrich 
Copa Bullrich was a domestic cup contested by teams in Segunda División. It was played under a single-elimination format. Boca Juniors was eliminated on the second round.

Friendly matches 
The match v Uruguayan club Universal became the first match played by Boca Juniors outside Argentina.

Statistics

Players statistics

References 

Club Atlético Boca Juniors seasons
1908 in association football